Feuerhalle Simmering  is a crematorium with attached urn burial ground in the Simmering district of Vienna, Austria. It lies at the end of an alley, directly opposite Vienna Central Cemetery's main gate.

Description
Opened on 17 December 1922 by Vienna's mayor Jakob Reumann, Feuerhalle Simmering was the first crematorium in Austria. It also constituted an element of the social and health services policy of Red Vienna. Advocates of cremation, especially from the labour movement  – such as the Workers' Cremation Association "The Flame"  –, had been campaigning for decades for crematoria in Austria, but applications were always rejected by the authorities. In 1921, Vienna's City Council, now under Social Democrat rule, approved the construction of a crematorium in Vienna. Reumann had to defend this decision at the Austrian Constitutional Court as he had granted building permission for the crematorium against the order of a federal minister from the Christian Social Party. The lawsuit was finally decided in 1924 in favour of the crematorium.

Feuerhalle Simmering'''s main building and its immediate surroundings were planned by Clemens Holzmeister, who designed the crematorium to resemble an oriental fortress. Holzmeister's design carefully placed the crematorium into the walled gardens of the derelict Schloss Neugebäude, and thus also put the former palace gardens with its many ancient trees (designated natural monuments) to new use as urn burial ground.

Robert Danneberg (1882–1942) and Käthe Leichter (1895–1942), two prominent Social Democrat politicians associated with Red Vienna, were killed in Nazi concentration camps and have symbolic graves of honour at Feuerhalle Simmering.

Notable cremations
Ashes on site

 Friedrich Achleitner (1930–2019), poet and architecture critic
 Manfred Ackermann (1898–1991), politician
 Hellmut Andics (1922–1998), journalist
 H.C. Artmann (1921–2000), writer
 Hugo Bettauer (1872–1925), writer
 Turhan Bey (1922–2012), actor
 William Blankenship (1928–2017), opera singer
 Elfriede Blauensteiner (1931–2003), serial killer 
 Adele Bloch-Bauer (1881–1925), painted as Portrait of Adele Bloch-Bauer'' by Gustav Klimt
 Annie Dirkens (1869–1942), actress
 Rudolf Eisler (1873–1926), philosopher
 Roman Felleis (1903–1944), political activist
 Alfred Hermann Fried (1864–1921), publicist, awarded the Nobel Peace Prize in 1911 
 Joseph Gregor (1888–1960), writer
 Ferdinand Hanusch (1866–1923), politician
 Irene Harand (1900–1975), human rights activist  
 Guido Holzknecht (1872–1931), radiologist
 Hans Kloss (1905–1986), bank manager
 Friedrich Knauer (1850–1926), zoologist
 Johann Koplenig (1891–1968), politician
 Rudolf Kraus (1868–1932), pathologist
 Minna Lachs (1907–1993), educator 
 Hans Maršálek (1914–2011), political activist
 Jacob Levy Moreno (1889–1974), psychiatrist
 Franz von Nopcsa (1877–1933), paleontologist 
 Max Pallenberg (1877–1934), actor
 Alfred Piccaver (1884–1958), opera singer
 Rudolf Prikryl (1896–1965), mayor of Vienna
 Jakob Reumann (1853–1925), mayor of Vienna
 Hilde Rössel-Majdan (1921–2010), opera singer
 Alexander Roda Roda (1872–1945), writer
 Elisabeth Ruttkay (1926–2009), archaeologist 
 Miklós Sárkány (1908–1998), Olympic gold medalist
 Vera Schwarz (1888–1964), opera singer
 Amalie Seidel (1876–1952), politician
 Carl Sternberg (1872–1935), pathologist
 Teresa Stich-Randall (1927–2007), opera singer
 Julius Tandler (1869–1936), physician and politician
 Oswald Thomas (1882–1963), astronomer
 Stefan Weber (1946–2018), musician
 Alfred Maria Willner (1859–1929), writer

Ashes elsewhere
 Lale Andersen (1905–1972), singer and actress – ashes buried at Langeoog, Germany
 Arik Brauer (1929–2021), painter and singer-songwriter – ashes buried in Vienna Central Cemetery
 Alfred Ebenbauer (1945–2007), medievalist – ashes buried in Vienna Central Cemetery
 Nika Brettschneider (1951–2018), Charter 77 signatory – ashes given to family
 Erich Feigl (1931–2007), journalist and filmmaker – ashes buried in Simmeringer Friedhof, Vienna
 Marlen Haushofer (1920–1970), writer – ashes buried at Steyr City Cemetery
 Ernst Hinterberger (1931–2012), writer – ashes buried in Vienna Central Cemetery
 Franz Holzweber (1904–1934), July Putsch assassin  – ashes buried in Friedhof Mauer, Vienna
 Ernst Kirchweger (1898–1965), victim of political violence – ashes now buried in Hietzing Cemetery, Vienna
 György Ligeti (1923–2006), composer – ashes buried in Vienna Central Cemetery
 Jörg Mauthe (1924–1986), writer – ashes kept at his family's Burgruine Mollenburg
 Freda Meissner-Blau (1927–2015), politician – ashes given to family
 Alexander Moissi (1879–1935), actor – ashes buried at Morcote, Switzerland
 Sabine Oberhauser (1963–2017), politician  – ashes buried in Hietzing Cemetery, Vienna
 Otto Planetta (1899–1934), July Putsch assassin  – ashes buried in Dornbacher Friedhof, Vienna
 Hugo Portisch (1927–2021), journalist – ashes buried in Vienna Central Cemetery
 Barbara Prammer (1954–2014), politician – ashes buried in Vienna Central Cemetery
 Werner Schneyder (1937–2019), cabaret performer – ashes buried in Vienna Central Cemetery
 Otto Tausig (1922–2011), actor – ashes buried in Vienna Central Cemetery
 Helene Thimig (1889–1974), actress – ashes now buried in Neustifter Friedhof, Vienna
 Lotte Tobisch (1926–2019), actress – ashes buried in Grinzinger Friedhof, Vienna 
 Joe Zawinul (1932–2007), musician – ashes buried in Vienna Central Cemetery

References

External links

 
 

 
1922 establishments in Austria
Buildings and structures in Simmering (Vienna)
Cemeteries in Vienna
Tourist attractions in Vienna
20th-century architecture in Austria